Edward Parsons (January 1879 – 1956), known as Ted or Teddy Parsons, was an English footballer who played in the Football League for Stoke and in the Southern League for Brighton & Hove Albion.

Career
Parsons was born in Stoke-upon-Trent and played amateur football with Stafford Rangers before joining Stoke in 1887. He was used as back up to Joe Murphy but he played in all of Stoke's matches in the FA Cup in 1898–99 as the team reached the semi-final before being beaten 3–1 by Derby County.

Murphy joined Woolwich Arsenal and Parsons took his place for the 1899–1900 and missed just two matches. But he lost his place to Billy Leech and left Stoke for Featherstone Rangers and then Brighton & Hove Albion.

Career statistics

References

1879 births
1956 deaths
Footballers from Stoke-on-Trent
English footballers
Association football midfielders
Stafford Rangers F.C. players
Stoke City F.C. players
Brighton & Hove Albion F.C. players
English Football League players
Southern Football League players